Edmund Jeremy James Walker (3 February 1935 – 19 July 2019), known professionally as Jeremy Kemp, was an English actor. He was known for his significant roles in the miniseries The Winds of War and War and Remembrance, the film The Blue Max, and the TV series Z-Cars.

Early life
Kemp was born 3 February 1935 in Chesterfield, Derbyshire, the son of Elsa May (daughter of Dr James Kemp, of Sheffield) and Edmund Reginald Walker, an engineer, of a Yorkshire landed gentry family that had owned at various times Aldwick Hall at Rotherham, Silton Hall at Northallerton, Ravensthorpe Manor, and Mount St John, at Thirsk. Kemp attended Abbotsholme School in Staffordshire from 1943 to 1953. He studied acting at the Central School of Speech and Drama.

Career
In 1958, Kemp joined the Radio Drama Company by winning the Carlton Hobbs Bursary He was an original cast member of Z-Cars playing PC Bob Steele, but left after just over a year in the role. His other television credits include Colditz, Space: 1999 and a number of other series, such as Hart to Hart, The Greatest American Hero, The Fall Guy, The Adventures of Sherlock Holmes, Conan the Adventurer, Star Trek: The Next Generation, The Winds of War, War and Remembrance and Murder, She Wrote. He played King Leontes in the BBC Television production of The Winter's Tale (1981). He also appeared as Cornwall in the 1983 TV movie version of King Lear opposite Laurence Olivier as Lear.
 
From the mid-1960s to the mid-1970s, Kemp had a prominent film career, usually appearing as second male leads or top supporting roles. His films include Dr. Terror's House of Horrors, Operation Crossbow, The Blue Max, Darling Lili, A Bridge Too Far, The Seven-Per-Cent Solution, Top Secret! and Four Weddings and a Funeral.

Personal life and death
Kemp was an avid bird watcher. Private about his personal life, at various times he lived in Britain and California. Kemp's long-term partner was an American woman, Christopher Harter. Her parents, who had expected a boy, named her in honour of a family friend. Kemp was quoted as saying he found the idea of marriage to be "too tying". Jeremy Kemp died on 19 July 2019 aged 84, Harter having predeceased him.

Partial filmography

Cleopatra (1963) as Agitator
Edgar Wallace Mysteries (1964 film) as Vince Howard - "Face of a Stranger" episode
Dr. Terror's House of Horrors (1965) as Jerry Drake (segment 2 "Creeping Vine")
Operation Crossbow (1965) as Phil Bradley 
Cast a Giant Shadow (1966) as Senior British Officer
The Blue Max (1966) as Willi von Klugemann
Assignment K (1968) as Hal 
The Strange Affair (1968) as Det. Sgt. Pierce
A Twist of Sand (1968) as Harry Riker
Eyewitness (1970) as Inspector Galleria
Darling Lili (1970) as Colonel Kurt Von Ruger
The Games (1970) as Jim Harcourt
Pope Joan (1972) as Joan's Father
The Belstone Fox  (1973) as John Kendrick
The Blockhouse (1973) as Grabinski
Lips of Lurid Blue (1975) as George Stevens
The Seven-Per-Cent Solution (1976) as Baron Karl von Leinsdorf
The Rhinemann Exchange (1977, TV movie) as Geoffrey Moore
A Bridge Too Far (1977) as R.A.F. Briefing Officer
East of Elephant Rock (1977) as Harry Rawlins
Leopard in the Snow (1978) as Bolt
Caravans (1978) as Dr. Smythe
The Treasure Seekers (1979) as Reginald Landers
The Prisoner of Zenda (1979) as Duke Michael
The Return of the Soldier (1982) as Frank
The Greatest American Hero (1982, TV series, episode: "Divorce, Venusian Style") as Franz Zedlocker
The Winds of War (1983, TV miniseries) as Brigadier General Armin Von Roon
Uncommon Valor (1983) as Ferryman
George Washington (1984, TV miniseries) as General Gates
The Adventures of Sherlock Holmes (1984, episode: "The Speckled Band") as Dr. Grimesby Roylott
Top Secret! (1984) as General Streck
Peter the Great (1986, TV miniseries) as Col. Patrick Gordon
 Slip-Up (1986, TV movie) as Jack Slipper
War and Remembrance (1988, TV miniseries) as Brigadier General Armin Von Roon
When the Whales Came (1989) as Mr. Wellbeloved
 Summer's Lease (1989) as Buck Kettering
Star Trek: The Next Generation (1990, TV series) as Robert Picard
Prisoner of Honor (1991, TV movie) as Gen. de Pellieux
Four Weddings and a Funeral (1994) as Sir John Delaney
Angels & Insects (1995) as Sir Harald Alabaster

References

External links

1935 births
2019 deaths
English male film actors
English male television actors
People from Chesterfield, Derbyshire
Alumni of the Royal Central School of Speech and Drama
20th-century English male actors